Scirocco was a Formula One constructor from the United Kingdom. They participated in seven World Championship Grands Prix, entering a total of nine cars, as well as numerous non-Championship Grands Prix. Scirocco also provided chassis for private entrants.

Complete Formula One results

World Championship results
(key)

Non-Championship results
(key)

References 

 Scirocco-Powell profile at Grand Prix Encyclopedia

Formula One constructors
Formula One entrants
British auto racing teams
British racecar constructors